Fine Gael leadership election may refer to:

 1987 Fine Gael leadership election
 1990 Fine Gael leadership election
 2001 Fine Gael leadership election
 2002 Fine Gael leadership election
 2017 Fine Gael leadership election